Justin Boyd is an American politician. He serves as a Republican member for the 27th district of the Arkansas Senate. He also served as a member for the 77th district of the Arkansas House of Representatives.

Life and career 
Boyd attended the University of Arkansas–Fort Smith, the University of Arkansas for Medical Sciences College of Pharmacy and Sam M. Walton College of Business.

In 2015, Boyd was elected to represent the 77th district of the Arkansas House of Representatives, succeeding Stephanie Malone. He served until 2022, when he sought election to the Arkansas Senate.

In May 2022, Boyd defeated Kelly Procter Pierce in the Republican primary election for the 27th district of the Arkansas Senate. In November 2022, he defeated Becky Ward in the general election, winning 63 percent of the votes. He assumed office in the 94th Arkansas General Assembly on January 9, 2023.

References 

Living people
Place of birth missing (living people)
Year of birth missing (living people)
Republican Party members of the Arkansas House of Representatives
Republican Party Arkansas state senators
21st-century American politicians
University of Arkansas–Fort Smith alumni
Sam M. Walton College of Business alumni